In enzymology, a deoxycytidylate C-methyltransferase is an enzyme that catalyzes the chemical reaction

5,10-methylenetetrahydrofolate + dCMP  dihydrofolate + deoxy-5-methylcytidylate

Thus, the two substrates of this enzyme are 5,10-Methylenetetrahydrofolic acid and dCMP, whereas its two products are dihydrofolic acid and deoxy-5-methylcytidylic acid.

This enzyme belongs to the family of transferases, specifically those transferring one-carbon group methyltransferases.  The systematic name of this enzyme class is 5,10-methylenetetrahydrofolate:dCMP C-methyltransferase. Other names in common use include deoxycytidylate methyltransferase, and dCMP methyltransferase.

References

 

EC 2.1.1
Enzymes of unknown structure